Victor (Viktor) Mikhalevski (born 8 July 1972) is an Israeli chess grandmaster who lives in Beersheba.

 his Elo rating was 2611, making him the #7 player in Israel and the 171st-highest rated player in the world. His peak rating to date was 2632, which he reached on 1 January 2008.

Career
Mikhalevski was born in Gomel, Belarus. He played for Israel as second reserve (+4 –1 =2) in the 37th Chess Olympiad at Turin 2006 and at third board (+1 -1 =4) in the 17th European Team Championship at Novi Sad 2009.

He won the Calvià Open in Majorca, Spain in October 2007, winning in each of the first seven rounds to finish with a score of 8/9 for a performance of 2876. Kevin Spraggett was second at 7/9.
He also won a category 12 invitational tournament at Montreal in 2005 with 8/11 (+5 -0 =6) and tied for first at the 2008 Canadian Open Chess Championship in Montreal, with 6/9. He also was Israeli Vice-Champion in 1998 and tied for first in 1996 in Jerusalem and in 2008 in Haifa.

In major tournaments, he in 1991 and 1992 was Israel champion U-20, in 1991 tied for 2–3 in the Open Israel Championship. He also won the 1993 First Saturday tournament in Budapest with 10 out of 13, the 1994 International Festival in Tel Aviv, the 1995 Open tournament in Paris and the Tel Aviv Open, the 1997 International Festival in Rishon-Lezion, Israel, 2nd VAM Open in Hoogeveen, Netherlands in 1998, the 1998 14th International Festival in Tel Aviv, 2000 Open Championship of Rishon Lezion, Israel, the 2002 International Festival in Biel, Switzerland(rapid), 6th Itau Cup in São Paulo, Brazil, 1st and 2nd International tournaments in San Salvador, El Salvador in 2002 and 2003, 2003 Quebec Open in Montreal, Quebec, Canada in all 3 sections (classical, rapid, blitz), 2005 Lake George Open, New York, US, 2006 category 10 Spring Invitational in Schaumburg, Illinois, US, with 7.5 out of 9, 2006 GM Slugfest in Bellevue, Washington, US, 2007 Curaçao Chess festival, Netherlands Antilles, 7.5 out of 9.

He tied for first in the 1999 Lost Boys tournament in Antwerpen, Belgium, 2003 First International  Festival in Ashdod, Israel, 2004 International festival in Drammen, Norway, with 8 out of 9, 2006 International Festival in Ashdod, Israel, 2006 International tournament in Coamo, Puerto Rico, 2007 World Open in Philadelphia, US, 2007 Miami Open, Florida, US, 2009 4th Edmonton International, Canada and 2009 North American Open in Las Vegas, Nevada, US. In 2010, he tied for 2nd–5th with Michael Adams, Evgeniy Najer and Jiří Štoček the 14th Chicago Open, and later in the same year he was a member of the bronze medal-winning Israel team for the 39th Chess Olympiad.

Mikhalevski was awarded the IM title in 1993 and the GM title in 1996.

In 2014 he won the Israeli championship.

He competed at the 2017 Maccabiah Games.

In 2019, he won 2nd- 4th place in the Israeli Open Championships along with Gad Rechlis and Michal Lahav with 7/9 points.

Life and family
Victor's brother is Alexander Mikhalevski, an international master in chess.

References

External links

Official website

CXR Chess
World Chess Network

1972 births
20th-century Belarusian Jews
21st-century Belarusian Jews
Living people
People from Gomel
Belarusian emigrants to Israel
Israeli people of Belarusian-Jewish descent
Israeli Jews
Chess Olympiad competitors
Chess grandmasters
Belarusian chess players
Israeli chess players
Jewish chess players
Competitors at the 2017 Maccabiah Games
Maccabiah Games chess players
Maccabiah Games competitors for Israel